Western Street is an uphill one-way street (from north to south) in Sai Ying Pun, Hong Kong. It connects Bonham Road in the south and Connaught Road West in the north. There are 337 units in 17 buildings in the street. Addresses are odd on the west side of the street, and mostly even on the east side. However, on the newer part of the street, on the reclamation north of Queen's Road West, the east side has both odd and even numbered addresses.

Landmarks
From North to south
 Western Police Station, near Des Voeux Road West
 Western Magistracy, government offices between Queen's Road West and First Street.
 Western District Community Centre between Second and Third Streets. The building was first built in 1922 as the Tsan Yuk Maternity Hospital operated under the Chinese Public Dispensary Committee.
 Kau Yan School and Kau Yan Church, below High Street
 King's College, near Bonham Road

Residential Buildings
Named buildings from North to south
 Wing Cheung Building with 23 floors and 90 units
 Scholar Court with 24 units

Intersecting Streets
From North to south
 Connaught Road West
 Des Voeux Road West
 Pok Fu Lam Road
 Queen's Road West
 First Street
 Second Street
 Third Street
 High Street
 Bonham Road

See also
 List of streets and roads in Hong Kong

References

External links

 
Map of Western Street, Hong Kong
Google Maps of Western Street

Sai Ying Pun
Roads on Hong Kong Island